René Sylviano (1903–1993) was a French composer who worked on around eighty film scores.

Selected filmography
 Levy and Company (1930)
 Tenderness (1930)
 The Unknown Singer (1931)
 The Improvised Son  (1932)
 The Premature Father (1933)
 The Porter from Maxim's (1933)
 Golden Venus (1938)
 Annette and the Blonde Woman (1942)
 I Am with You (1943)
 The White Waltz (1943)
 Majestic Hotel Cellars (1945)
 Roger la Honte (1946)
 Her Final Role (1946)
 The Revenge of Roger (1946)
 The Temptation of Barbizon (1947)
 The Mysterious Monsieur Sylvain (1947)
 Five Red Tulips (1949)
 Last Love (1949)
 The King of the Bla Bla Bla (1951)
 Love and Desire (1951)
 Grand Gala (1952)
 One Step to Eternity (1954)
 The Count of Bragelonne (1954)
 Her First Date (1955)
 The Terror with Women (1956)
 The Seventh Commandment (1957)
 Women's Prison (1958)
 The Bread Peddler (1963)

References

Bibliography
 O'Brien, Charles. Cinema's Conversion to Sound: Technology and Film Style in France and the U.S.. Indiana University Press, 2005.

External links

1903 births
1993 deaths
People from Mantes-la-Jolie
Prix de Rome for composition
20th-century French composers
French film score composers
French male film score composers
20th-century French male musicians